On September 12, 2014, during a shift change at the Pennsylvania State Police barracks in Blooming Grove Township, two state troopers were shot with a .308 caliber rifle. One trooper died at the scene and another was taken to a hospital where he recovered. Eric Frein was identified by the police as the only suspect in the case, and led the police on a weeks-long manhunt. He was eventually captured at an abandoned airport hangar on October 30, and charged with terrorism, murder, and attempted murder. Frein was convicted of all charges in April 2017, and subsequently sentenced to death.

Attack 
At 10:50 p.m. on September 12, 2014, a shift change was commencing outside the Troop R barracks of the Pennsylvania State Police in the Pocono Mountains in the Township of Blooming Grove, Pennsylvania. At that moment, a sniper opened fire with a .308-caliber rifle. One trooper was killed by the gunfire and a second was injured, but survived.

One trooper was shot trying to help the other, prompting him to crawl back to safety, where he was aided by two other troopers.

Victims 
Corporal Bryon K. Dickson II, 38, a seven-year veteran (killed)
Trooper Alex Douglass, 31, a ten-year veteran (injured)

Perpetrator 

Eric Matthew Frein was identified as the main suspect of the attack after the discovery of an abandoned 2001 Jeep Cherokee three days after the event. The vehicle was traced back to his parents, and multiple pieces of evidence, including bullet casings matched to the attack, were discovered inside. He led authorities on a manhunt after the shootings, eventually being placed on the FBI Ten Most Wanted Fugitives list.

Frein was described by police as a "self-taught survivalist" with a grudge against law enforcement personnel. At the time of the attack, he was a reenactor who acted in a variety of roles, most often Serbian soldiers. In 2008, Frein founded Istocni Vuk or "Eastern Wolf", whose Myspace page pictured Frein engaged in recreational military simulations as a Serbian soldier.

The police manhunt, initially involving nearly 200 officers by September 17, grew to nearly 1,000 on September 24. Law enforcement officers included local police; state police forces from Pennsylvania, New York, and New Jersey; Federal Bureau of Investigation; U.S. Marshals Service; and the Bureau of Alcohol, Tobacco, Firearms and Explosives. Frein was seen several times during the manhunt, but each time, officers were unable to approach him directly due to the rugged terrain of the area, which allowed Frein to escape. They subsequently believed Frein was taunting them during the manhunt. A colleague from the MilSim group "Red Alliance" suggested that "If he's re-enacting anyone, it's Rambo from the very first movie," referring to the character of John Rambo in First Blood.

Frein was captured by U.S. Marshals near Birchwood-Pocono Airpark, an abandoned airfield approximately  ENE of Tannersville, on October 30, 48 days after the shooting. At the time of his arrest, he was unarmed, but a .308-caliber rifle and a pistol were recovered afterward. He was arrested without incident and restrained using handcuffs belonging to Dickson. The day after his capture, he was charged with first-degree murder and attempted murder in the attack.

Although Frein did not resist arrest, he suffered a cut to the bridge of his nose, as well as a scrape over his left eye and bruises to his cheeks and eyes. The U.S. Marshals claim this occurred while he was lying on the ground during his arrest. The Pennsylvania State Police, however, claim these injuries occurred while he was on the run.

Aftermath 

After the attack, the Troop R barracks were immediately closed down for crime scene investigators to process it, and for repairs to windows shattered by gunfire. On November 12, 2014, two months after the attack, the barracks were reopened, with all but three employees (Alex Douglass and two others) returning to work.

Frein was indicted on a total of twelve charges, including terrorism and first-degree murder. He pleaded not guilty to all charges during his video arraignment on January 29, 2015. Prosecutors sought the death penalty.

Douglass, who suffered a gunshot wound to the pelvis, was taken to Geisinger Medical Center for treatment and was classified to be in stable but critical condition. Partially paralyzed by his injuries, he underwent sixteen surgeries at a New York City hospital in an effort to walk on his own again. In May 2015, his family announced that they forgave Frein for the shooting. Also in May 2015, Douglass shared his experience of being shot.

On April 19, 2017, Frein was convicted on all 12 counts, including first-degree murder. On April 27, 2017, Frein was sentenced to death by lethal injection and sent to Pennsylvania's death row.

Reactions 
Governor Tom Corbett released a statement after the attack, saying, "Every attack on an officer of the law is an attack on our state, our country and civilized society." He also ordered all state flags at the Pennsylvania State Capitol and commonwealth facilities to be flown at half-staff.

State Police Commissioner Frank Noonan called the attack "cowardly" and said, "It cuts us to the core that such an event could happen."

Congressman Tom Marino (R–10th) expressed his condolences to the victims and their families, and also condemned the attack, supporting the officers in their manhunt for the shooter.

References 

2014 murders in the United States
2014 in Pennsylvania
American police officers killed in the line of duty
Anti-police violence in the United States
Assassinated police officers
Attacks in the United States in 2014
Crime in Pennsylvania
Deaths by firearm in Pennsylvania
Pennsylvania State Police
Pike County, Pennsylvania
Law enforcement in Pennsylvania
September 2014 crimes in the United States
Terrorist incidents in Pennsylvania
Terrorist incidents in the United States in 2014